State Highway 83 (SH 83) is a state highway in the U.S. state of Texas that runs  from the New Mexico border in Yoakum County east to Welch in northwest Dawson County.

History

The original SH 83 was designated on August 21, 1923 along a route from Lamesa east to an intersection with SH 18 in western Shackelford County  as a renumbering of  SH 18B. On May 21, 1928, SH 83 was extended west to the New Mexico border to connect with New Mexico State Road 83. The route was transferred to SH 15 (now US 180) on August 8, 1935, though the change was not effective until September 1, 1935. New Mexico State Road 83 was realigned in the 1950s, connecting with SH 328 instead. On March 31, 1955, SH 328 was renumbered to SH 83 "for the convenience of the traveling public" In 1988, the New Mexico connecting highway was renumbered New Mexico State Road 132.

Major intersections

References

083
Transportation in Yoakum County, Texas
Transportation in Gaines County, Texas
Transportation in Dawson County, Texas